Westair Benin is an airline based in Cotonou, Benin. It was established and started operations in November 2002 and operated regional flights in West Africa. Its main base is Cadjehoun Airport. The airline ceased operations in 2015 but was said to be restarting operations as of mid-2016.

Destinations 
Westair Benin operated regional services from Cotonou to 8 destinations throughout West Africa for Winter Season 2012/2013:

Benin
Cotonou – Cadjehoun Airport Main Hub
Burkina Faso
Ouagadougou – Ouagadougou Airport
Cameroon
Douala – Douala Airport
Democratic Republic of the Congo
Kinshasa – N'djili Airport
Republic of the Congo
Brazzaville – Maya-Maya Airport
Pointe-Noire – Antonio Agostinho Neto Airport
Côte d'Ivoire
Abidjan – Port Bouet Airport
Equatorial Guinea
Malabo – Malabo International Airport
Gabon
Libreville – Leon M'ba Airport
Niger
Niamey – Diori Hamani Airport
Nigeria
Abuja – Nnamdi Azikiwe Airport

Fleet 
The Westair Benin fleet consists of the following aircraft (as of July 2015):

See also 
 List of defunct airlines of Benin

References 

Airlines established in 2002
Airlines formerly banned in the European Union
2002 establishments in Benin
Defunct airlines of Benin